Gisela Williams Camet Bekker (born 15 March 1972) is an Argentine sailor. She competed in the Europe event at the 1992 Summer Olympics.

References

1972 births
Living people
Place of birth missing (living people)
Argentine female sailors (sport)
Olympic sailors of Argentina
Sailors at the 1992 Summer Olympics – Europe